Strabane (CDR) railway station was one of two terminals serving Strabane, County Tyrone in Northern Ireland.

The Finn Valley Railway operated an Irish Gauge route to Stranorlar from Strabane (GNI) railway station from 7 September 1863. The two stations were connected by a footbridge.

The station was also later the terminus for the Strabane and Letterkenny Railway which operated from 1909.  The station closed on 1 January 1960.

The site is now occupied by an Asda supermarket car park.

Routes

References

Disused railway stations in County Tyrone
Railway stations opened in 1894
Railway stations closed in 1960
1894 establishments in Ireland
1960 disestablishments in Northern Ireland
Railway stations in Northern Ireland opened in the 19th century